HMS Howe was a 120-gun first-rate ship of the line of the Royal Navy, launched on 28 March 1815 at Chatham.

Howe was broken up in 1854.

Notes

References

Lavery, Brian (2003) The Ship of the Line - Volume 1: The development of the battlefleet 1650-1850. Conway Maritime Press. .

External links
 

Ships of the line of the Royal Navy
Nelson-class ships of the line
Ships built in Chatham
1815 ships